Gopal Mishra (1933 – November 1, 2009) was an Indian journalist and columnist.

Career
Born in Bidyadharpur, Cuttack, Orissa in 1933, Mishra's career spanned five decades, starting with the Oriya daily Prajatantra, followed by editorship of the English newspaper of the same group the Eastern Times.

He worked several years for the Amrita Bazar Patrika, a daily newspaper in Kolkata, as head of the News Bureau. After leaving them he became a freelance writer and settled in Bhubaneshwar. His columns and articles appeared in newspapers for leading Oriya daily `Sambad', 'Jhankara' and other publications.

Death
He died on November 1, 2009, at the age of 77 and was survived by his wife, four sons and a daughter

References

1932 births
2009 deaths
Indian male journalists
Indian columnists
People from Cuttack district
Journalists from Odisha